"Poison" is a song by American musician Alice Cooper. Written by Cooper, producer Desmond Child and guitarist John McCurry, the song was released as a single in July 1989 from Cooper's eighteenth album, Trash. It became one of Cooper's biggest hit singles in the United States, peaking at number seven on the Billboard Hot 100. The power ballad performed even better in the UK by peaking at number two on the UK Singles Chart. "Poison" remains one of Alice Cooper's best known songs. It is ranked by Billboard as the "91st top song of 1989", while Ultimate Classic Rock ranked it as the "7th best Alice Cooper song", commenting "Poison sounds like a typical '80s pop-metal number at times, but Cooper’s intensity brings it to a whole other level." The song's main riff was written by guitarist John McCurry, who two years earlier had used it for the John Waite track "Encircled".

Music video
There are two versions of the video to the song, one of which shows Alice Cooper being chained to a bizarre mechanism and singing while a ghostly woman looms over him. The original video had to be censored for showings during the day, due to shots of a topless model. Rana Kennedy plays the roles of both women in the video but the topless scene were shot with a body double. This is notably visible in the video. The studios in which the video was filmed in spring of 1989 have since been torn down and are now a parking lot in Los Angeles. The video is still often played on MTV Classic's Metal Mayhem.

Charts

Weekly charts

Year-end charts

Certifications

Cover versions
The Vandals, 1993
Groove Coverage, 2003
Husky Rescue, 2007
Baracuda, 2008 (sampled in "Where Is The Love", alongside Amaranth by Nightwish)
Alex Day, 2013
Powerwolf, 2023

Film & media usage 

 Tango & Cash, 1989
 The Jackal, 1997
 End of Days, 1999
 Peter Pan, 2003
 Mean Creek, 2004
 Pineapple Express, 2008
 A modified version of the song was featured in a February 2011 television ad campaign for the Volkswagen Passat.
 Spartacus Vengeance, 2012

References

1989 singles
Songs written by Desmond Child
Songs written by Alice Cooper
Alice Cooper songs
Song recordings produced by Desmond Child
1989 songs
Epic Records singles
Songs about BDSM
Glam metal ballads
1980s ballads